Hinterstoder is a municipality in the district of Kirchdorf an der Krems in Upper Austria, Austria.
The village is located close on the border to the federal state Styria and 600 m above sea level. Hinterstoder is surrounded by several mountains: Grosser Priel (2,514 m),  Kleiner Priel (2,134 m), Spitzmauer (2,446 m) and Warscheneck (2,389 m). 

The municipality of Hinterstoder consist of following villages: Hinterberg, Hinterstoder, Mitterstoder, and Hintertambergau.

Hinterstoder has been part of Austria since the 12th century, when it was conquered from the Duchy of Bavaria.

The village was mentioned the first time in a document in 1240 as "Stoder". Stoder is a word from the Slavonic language and means "cold" or "stony ground". The first settlers of Hinterstoder were Slavs. The Traun river which flows through the cities of Wels and Linz, was the border between the German-speaking and the Slavonian-speaking settlers in those times.

In 1890 the first overnight stays were recorded. Tourism started in Hinterstoder. In 1897 the first police station was opened. Hinterstoder received its railway connection in 1906 and in 1910 the sport of skiing became popular. The first ski race took place on 10 December 1912. Today the village is world-famous for its world cup ski races. The first ski race for the world cup was hosted in 1986. This was another important stimulus for winter tourism in Hinterstoder. Since the competition among the candidates for World Cup races is very large and the World Cup course on the Bärenalm did not meet the requirements of the FIS anymore, the chairman of the Ski Club Hinterstoder Rudolf Rohregger urged to rapidly construct a new, more attractive and selective World Cup slope in Hinterstoder. This ambitious goal has been achieved with the new World Cup Run on the Hoess.
 
The construction of the race course was started in late summer 2004; in the winter of 2004/05, the runway was partially available and already then caused a stir. The first World Cup race on the new slope took place in the 2006-07 season.
 
The new "Hannes Trinkl valley descent" honors its namesake, one of the world's best local downhill skiers in recent years. With a length of 2,250 meters, the piste runs more or less directly into the valley with an average slope of 35 percent. Natural terrain edges and steep slopes with a gradient of 55 and 60 percent make this run particularly spectacular. The slope meets all the required criteria to hold FIS World Cup Super G, giant slalom and slalom races for men and ladies.
 
Special attention was paid to the design of the finish arena, from where spectators can view large parts of the slope and reach the finish area easily from the nearby parking. Since its completion Hinterstoder hosted a meeting of the 2011 World Cup with complete success.

References

Totes Gebirge
Cities and towns in Kirchdorf an der Krems District